Lloyd Francis MacMahon (August 12, 1912 – April 8, 1989) was a United States district judge of the United States District Court for the Southern District of New York from 1959 to 1989 and its Chief Judge from 1980 to 1982. Among the many recent law school graduates to serve as his law clerk was Rudy Giuliani.

Education and career

Born on August 12, 1912, in Elmira, New York, MacMahon received an Artium Baccalaureus degree in 1936 from Cornell University and a Bachelor of Laws in 1938 from Cornell Law School. He was a lieutenant in the United States Naval Reserve during World War II from 1944 to 1945. He was in private practice in New York City from 1942 to 1953 and again from 1955 to 1959. He was the Chief Assistant United States Attorney for the Southern District of New York from 1953 to 1955. He was the United States Attorney for the Southern District of New York in 1955.

Federal judicial service

MacMahon was nominated by President Dwight D. Eisenhower on March 10, 1959, to a seat on the United States District Court for the Southern District of New York vacated by Judge Lawrence Walsh. He was confirmed by the United States Senate on September 9, 1959, and received his commission on September 10, 1959. He served as Chief Judge and as a member of the Judicial Conference of the United States from 1980 to 1982. He assumed senior status on May 31, 1982. He served as a Judge of the United States Foreign Intelligence Surveillance Court from 1985 to 1989. His served on the bench until his death on April 8, 1989, due to a cerebral hemorrhage in White Plains, New York.

References

Sources
 

1912 births
1989 deaths
Judges of the United States District Court for the Southern District of New York
United States district court judges appointed by Dwight D. Eisenhower
20th-century American judges
United States Navy officers
Cornell Law School alumni
Judges of the United States Foreign Intelligence Surveillance Court
Assistant United States Attorneys